OML (aka TeX math italic) is a 7-bit TeX encoding developed by Donald E. Knuth. It encodes italic Latin and Greek letters for mathematical formulas and various symbols.

Character set

See also 
 OMS encoding
 OT1 encoding

References 

Character sets